Frank Cyril Palmer (Swansea - , Swansea) was a Welsh rugby union player. He played for the Wales rugby union team.

References

1896 births
1925 deaths
Rugby union players from Swansea
Wales international rugby union players
Welsh rugby union players